Rob Echeverria (born 15 December 1967) is an American guitarist who has worked as the guitarist of Biohazard, Helmet, Rest in Pieces, and Straight Ahead. While in Helmet, he helped compose and record the song "Milquetoast", which was released on The Crow's soundtrack. Both of Echeverria's parents were originally from Ecuador.

Discography
with Straight Ahead
Breakaway (1987)

with Rest in Pieces
My Rage (1987)
Under My Skin (1990)

with Helmet
Betty (1994)

with BiohazardNew World Disorder (1999)

References

 

1967 births
Living people
American heavy metal guitarists
American people of Ecuadorian descent
Guitarists from New York City
People from Bayside, Queens
People from Queens, New York
Rhythm guitarists
20th-century American guitarists
Francis Lewis High School alumni